Alī ibn Abī Ṭālib (600–661 CE) was the fourth rāshidūn caliph (r. 656–661) and the first Imam of Islam—cousin, son-in-law, and companion (ṣaḥāba) of Muhammad. He is revered by Sunnī Muslims as the fourth rāshidūn ("rightly-guided") caliph, and as a foremost religious authority on the Quran and Islamic jurisprudence (fiqh). Shīʿa Muslims consider him to be the first Imam appointed by Muhammad and the first rāshidūn caliph. Alī was the cousin of Muhammad, and after marriage to his daughter Fāṭimah he also became Muhammad's son-in-law.

His father was ʾAbū Ṭālib ibn ʿAbd al-Muṭṭalib, the leader of Banu Hashim, a clan of the Qurayshi tribe of Mecca in the Hejazi region of the Arabian peninsula, and his mother was Fāṭimah bint ʾAsad, but he was raised in the household of Muhammad, who himself was raised by ʾAbū Ṭālib, Muhammad's uncle. When Muhammad reported receiving a divine revelation, Alī was one of the first believers in Islam at the age of 12, dedicating his life to the cause of Islam.

Origins 

Alī ibn Abī Ṭālib had four children through the marriage with Muhammad's daughter Fāṭimah: Ḥasan ibn ʿAlī, Ḥusayn ibn ʿAlī, Zaynab bint ʿAlī, and Umm Kulthūm bint ʿAlī. His other well-known sons were ʿAbbās ibn ʿAlī, born to Umm al-Banin Fāṭimah bint Hizam, and Muḥammad ibn al-Ḥanafīyya, from Khawla bint Jaʿfar al-Ḥanafīyya, another wife from the central Arabian tribe of Banu Hanifa, whom Alī had also married after Fāṭimah's death.

His first son Ḥasan, born in 625 CE, is revered as the second Imam by Shīʿa Muslims and he also assumed the role of rāshidūn ("rightly-guided") caliph for several months after Alī's death. In the year AH 50 he died after being poisoned by a member of his own household named Jada who, according to historians, had been motivated by Muʿāwiya I, which had been previously appointed by ʿUmar ibn al-Khaṭṭāb as the governor of Syria in 639 CE after the previous governor died in a plague along with 25,000 other people.

Ḥusayn, born in 626 CE, is regarded as the third Imam by Shīʿa Muslims, whom Yazid ibn Mu'awiyah persecuted severely. On the tenth day of Muharram, of the year 680 CE, Ḥusayn lined up before the army of Yazid with his small band of followers and nearly all of them were killed in the Battle of Karbala. The anniversary of his death is called the Day of Ashura and it is a day of mourning and religious observance for Shīʿa Muslims. In this battle some of Alī's other sons were killed. Al-Tabari has mentioned their names in his history: Abbas ibn Ali, the holder of Ḥusayn's standard, Ja'far, Abdullah, and Uthman, the four sons born to Umm al-Banin; Abu Bakr (otherwise known as Muhammad al-Asghar or "Muhammad the Younger"). There is, however, some doubt as to whether the last died in the battle. Some historians have added the names of Alī's other sons who were killed at Karbala, including Ibrahim, Umar, and Abdullah ibn al-Asghar. His daughter Zaynab—who was in Karbala—was captured by Yazid's army and later played a great role in revealing what happened to Ḥusayn and his followers.

Alī's descendants through the marriage with Muhammad's daughter Fāṭimah are known as sharifs or sayyids. These are honorific titles in Arabic, sharif meaning "noble" and sayyid meaning "lord" or "sir". As descendants of Muhammad, they are respected by both Sunnī and Shīʿa Muslims. Both the sons that he had through the marriage with Umama bint Zaynab, namely Muḥammad al-Awsaṭ ibn ʿAlī and ʿAwn ibn ʿAbd Allāh ibn Jaʿfar, died in Persia, with the latter having been martyred in a battle against Qays ibn Murrah (the governor of Khorasan), and the former dying naturally.

Alī's descendants through his son Abbas are known as Alvi Awans. Today, most of them reside in modern-day Arab world. They are descendants of Qutb Shah who is a direct descendant of Alī, and his lineage is traced as Qutb Shah (Awn) ibn Yaala ibn Hamza ibn Tayyar ibn Qasim ibn Ali ibn Ja'far ibn Hamza ibn al-Hasan ibn Ubaydullah ibn Abbas ibn Ali ibn Abu Talib. The Isaaq clan-family in Somaliland and Ethiopia claims to have descended from Alī's lineage through its forefather Ishaaq bin Ahmed.

Family tree (graphical)

Family tree (textual) 
Paternal grand father: Abd al-Muttalib ibn Hashim, see Family tree of Abd al-Muttalib
Paternal grand mother: Fatima bint Amr

Father: Abu Talib ibn Abd al-Muttalib
Mother: Fatimah bint Asad
Brother: Ja'far ibn Abi Talib
Nephew: Awn ibn Ja'far — married Umm Kulthum bint Ali
Nephew: Muhammad ibn Ja'far — married Umm Kulthum bint Ali
Nephew: Abd Allah ibn Ja'far — married Zaynab bint Ali and Umm Kulthum bint Ali
Grand Nephews: Awn ibn Abd Allah ibn Ja'far and Muhammad ibn Abd Allah ibn Ja'far — died at the Battle of Karbala
Brother: Aqil ibn Abi Talib
Nephew: Muslim ibn Aqil — died before the Battle of Karbala — (kufa)

Grand Nephews: Muhammad ibn Muslim and Ibrahim ibn Muslim — died before the Battle of Karbala
Brother: Talib ibn Abi Talib
Sister: Fakhitah bint Abi Talib
Sister: Jumanah bint Abi Talib
Paternal uncle: Hamza ibn Abd al-Muttalib
Paternal uncle: Abdullah ibn Abd al-Muttalib — father of Muhammad
Paternal aunt: Amina bint Wahb  — mother of Muhammad
Cousin: Muhammad
Cousin's daughters: Fatima, Zaynab, Ruqayya, Umm Kulthum
Cousin's sons: Qasim, Abd Allah, Ibrahim   
Mother in law(s) : Khadija through Fatima.
Zaynab through Umama. 
Brother-in-law(s): Uthman through Ruqayya & Umm Kulthum 
Abu al-As through Zaynab 
Himself: Ali

Descendants (textual) 

 Fatima; daughter of Muhammad, see Family tree of Muhammad
 Zaynab bint Ali
 Ali
 Awn
 Muhammad
 Abbas
 Umm Kulthum
 Umm Kulthum bint Ali
 Zayd, also known as Ibn Al-Khalīfatayn
 Ruqayya
 Muhsin ibn Ali
 Hasan ibn Ali
 Qasim
 Abu Bakr
 Muhammad
 Abd Allah
 Amr
Bishr
 Talha
 Abd al-Rahman
 Husayn al-Athram
 Umm Salama
 Muhammad
 Qasim
 Umm Kulthum
 Ruqayya
 Umm Salama
 Umm al-Hasan
 Umm al-Husayn
 Zayd
 Muhammad
 Yahya
 Husayn
 Hasan
 Muhammad
 Qasim
 Umm Kulthum
 Ali
 Ibrahim
 Zayd
 Isa
 Isma'il
 Ishaq
 Abd Allah
 Nafisa
 Hasan al-Muthanna
 Abd Allah al-Kamil
 Muhammad al-Nafs al-Zakiyya
 Ibrahim Qatil Bakhamra
 Idris al-Akbar
 Musa al-Jawn
 Sulayman
 Yahya
 Ja'far
 Isa
 Ibrahim al-Ghamr
 Isma'il
 Ya'qub
 Muhammad al-Akbar
 Muhammad al-Asghar
 Ishaq
 Ali
 Hasan al-Muthallath
 Hasan
 Ali al-Abid
 Talha
 Abd Allah
 Abbas
 Ibrahim
 Ja'far
 Dawud
 Muhammad
 Fatima bint Hasan
 Muhammad al-Baqir
 Ja'far al-Sadiq
 Abd Allah
 Ibrahim
 Ubayd Allah
 Ali
 Abd Allah
 Hasan
 Husayn al-Akbar
 Husayn ibn Ali; see also Daughters of Husayn ibn Ali
 Fatima al-Kubra, "Fatima the Elder"
 Abd Allah al-Kamil
 Muhammad al-Nafs al-Zakiyya
 Ibrahim Qatil Bakhamra
 Idris al-Akbar
 Musa al-Jawn
 Sulayman
 Yahya
 Ja'far
 Isa
 Ibrahim al-Ghamr
 Isma'il
 Ya'qub
 Muhammad al-Akbar
 Muhammad al-Asghar
 Ishaq
 Ali
 Hasan al-Muthallath
 Hasan
 Ali al-Abid
 Talha
 Abd Allah
 Abbas
 Ibrahim
 Fatima al-Sughra, "Fatima the Younger"
 Ruqayya
 Sakina
 Ali al-Akbar
 Ali al-Asghar
 Ali Zayn al-Abidin
 Muhammad al-Baqir
 Ja'far al-Sadiq
 Abd Allah
 Ibrahim
 Ubayd Allah
 Ali
 Abd Allah
 Hasan
 Husayn al-Akbar
 Zayd
 Hasan
 Yahya
 Husayn
 Muhammad
 Isa
Ahmad
 Umar
 Husayn al-Asghar
 Ubayd Allah al-A'raj
 Abd Allah al-Aqiqi
 Sulayman
 Ali
 Hasan
 Abd al-Rahman
 Sulayman
 Ali
 Muhammad al-Asghar

 Umama bint Abi al-As, granddaughter of Muhammad and Khadija through Zaynab, died 685 CE
 Muhammad al-Awsat ("Muhammad the Middle") or Hilal ibn Ali (14 – 64 AH or 636 – 700 CE)
 Abu Hashim Abd Allah (died 776 CE)
 Awn ibn Ali 

 Umm al-Banin, "Mother of many Sons", also known as Fatima bint Hizam al-Kilabiyya
 Abbas ibn Ali
 Ubayd Allah
 Fadl
 Qasim
 Hasan
 Muhammad
 Abd Allah ibn Ali
 Ja'far ibn Ali
 Uthman ibn Ali
 Ruqayya bint Ali

 Khawla bint Ja'far al-Hanafiyya
 Muhammad ibn al-Hanafiyya or Muhammad al-Akbar ("Muhammad the Elder") ibn Ali
 Abd Allah
 Hasan
 Ali
 Husayn
 Ibrahim
 Awn
 Qasim
 Ja'far

 Layla bint Mas'ud al-Darimiyya
 Ubayd Allah ibn Ali
 Abu Bakr or Muhammad al-Asghar ("Muhammad the Younger") ibn Ali

 Asma bint Umays al-Khath'amiyya
 Yahya bin Ali (? – 61 AH)
 Awn ibn Ali

 Al-Sahba bint Rabi'a al-Taghlibiyya
 Umar ibn Ali
 Ruqayya bint Ali

 Umm Sa'id bint Urwa al-Thaqafiyya
 Umm al-Hasan
 Ramla al-Kubra, "Ramla the Elder"
 Umm Kulthum al-Sughra, "Umm Kulthum the Younger"
 Umar ibn Ali

 Muhayya bint Imru al-Qays al-Kalbiyya
 Umm Ya'la

 Other(s): 
 Umm Hani
 Maymuna
 Zaynab al-Sughra, "Zaynab the Younger"
 Ruqayya
 Fatima
 Umama
 Khadija
 Umm al-Kiram
 Umm Salama
 Umm Ja'far Jumana
 Nafisa

Descendants (graphical) 
The Sayyid Aljabery family of southern Iraq are descendants of Ali from his son Imam Husayn. The Bukhari of Pakistan are Syed descendends of Ali, and includes 9 of the 12 Shia imams. The Idrisid and Alaouite dynasties of Morocco claim to be descended from Ali and Fatimah. The descendants of Ali include the Hashemite royal family of Jordan, the Isaaq clan-family in Somaliland and Ethiopia, the Husseini family of Lebanon, the Hiraki family of Syria and Egypt, the Alaouite royal family of Morocco and the Ashrafs of the city of Harar, Mashwanis and Awans (also referred as Alvis) of Pakistan. Other prominent descendants include: Muhammad al-Nafs al-Zakiyya, Abdullah al-Aftah, Ali al-Uraidhi ibn Ja'far al-Sadiq, Muhammad Ibn Qasim (al-Alawi), Muhammad ibn Ja'far al-Sadiq, Yahya ibn Umar, Muhammad ibn Ali al-Hadi and Ibn Dihya al-Kalby.

Lineage of Husayn ibn Ali 
This is a simplified family tree of Husayn ibn Ali. People in italics are considered by the majority of Shia and Sunni Muslims to be Ahl al-Bayt (People of the House). Twelver Shia also see the 4th to 12th Imams as Ahl al-Bayt (Ali is an imam in Mustaali but no number is assigned for this position, and Hasan ibn Ali is not an Imam in Nizari Imamah).

Lineage of Abbas ibn Ali 

This is a simplified family tree of Abbas ibn Ali.

See also 

 Alavi (surname)
 Alid
 Alaouite dynasty, current rulers of Morocco
 Ancestry of Qusai ibn Kilab
 Awan
 Banu Hashim
 Banu Kinanah
 Descent from Adnan to Muhammad
 Family tree of Muhammad
 Family tree of Shaiba ibn Hashim
 Fatimid Caliphate, rulers of Egypt
 Genealogy of Khadijah's daughters
 Hashemite
 Hasanids
 Husaynids
 Idrisid dynasty, rulers of Morocco
 Mudhar
 Muhammad ibn Abi Bakr, Ali's adopted son
 Quraysh tribe
 Sayyid
 Sharif

Notes

References

Works cited
 
 
 

Ali
 
Ali
Ali
Ali
Ali
Ali